This is a list of U.S. military prisons and brigs operated by the federal Department of Defense for prisoners and convicts from the United States military.

Current military prisons

Joint Prisons (housing inmates from all military branches) 
United States Army Corrections Command operated facilities
United States Disciplinary Barracks, Fort Leavenworth, Leavenworth, Kansas
Midwest Joint Regional Correctional Facility, Fort Leavenworth,  Leavenworth, Kansas
Northwest Joint Regional Correctional Facility, Joint Base Lewis-McChord, Fort Lewis, Washington
Consolidated brigs operated by the United States Navy
Naval Consolidated Brig, Charleston, Joint Base Charleston South Annex, Hanahan, South Carolina
Naval Consolidated Brig, Chesapeake, Naval Support Activity Hampton Roads Northwest Annex, Chesapeake, Virginia
Naval Consolidated Brig, Miramar, Marine Corps Air Station Miramar, San Diego, California

United States Army
United States Army Corrections Facility-Europe, Sembach Kaserne, Kaiserslautern, Germany
Army Regional Confinement Facility,  Camp Humphreys, USFK, South Korea

United States Marine Corps
Marine Corps Brig, Camp Pendleton, Marine Corps Base Camp Pendleton, California
Marine Corps Brig, Camp Hansen, Camp Hansen, Okinawa, Japan
Marine Corps Brig, Camp Lejeune, Marine Corps Base Camp Lejeune, North Carolina

United States Navy
Waterfront Brigs/CCU
Naval Brig/CCU Jacksonville, Naval Air Station Jacksonville, Jacksonville, Florida
Naval Brig/CCU Norfolk, Naval Station Norfolk, Norfolk, Virginia
Naval Brig Yokosuka, U.S. Fleet Activities Yokosuka, Japan
Naval Brig Rota, Naval Station Rota, Spain
Naval Brig, Pearl Harbor, Joint Base Pearl Harbor–Hickam, Pearl Harbor, Hawaii
Navy Brig, Puget Sound, Puget Sound Naval Shipyard, Washington
Pre-Trial Confinement Facilities/PCF
Pre-Trial Confinement Facility, Naval Station Great Lakes, North Chicago, Illinois
Pre-Trial Confinement Facility, Submarine Base New London, Connecticut
Pre-Trial Confinement Facility/Consolidated Confinement Unit, Commander, Fleet Activities Yokosuka, Japan
Pre-Trial Confinement Facility, Guantanamo Bay Naval Base, Guantanamo Bay, Cuba
Detention Facilities
Submarine Base Kings Bay, Georgia
Naval Station San Diego, California
Joint Base Anacostia-Bolling, District of Columbia
Naval Air Station North Island, California
Naval Air Station Lemoore, California
Naval Air Station Meridian, Mississippi
Naval Air Station Corpus Christi, Texas
Commander Fleet Activities Sasebo, Japan
Commander Naval Activities Marianas, Guam
Naval Support Activity Naples
Naval Support Facility Diego Garcia
Afloat Brigs
USS Nimitz (CVN-68)
USS Dwight D. Eisenhower (CVN-69)
USS Carl Vinson (CVN-70)
USS Theodore Roosevelt (CVN-71)
USS Abraham Lincoln (CVN-72)
USS George Washington (CVN-73)
USS John C. Stennis (CVN-74)
USS Harry S. Truman (CVN-75)
USS Ronald Reagan (CVN-76)
USS George H.W. Bush (CVN-77)
USS Gerald R. Ford (CVN-78)
USS Wasp (LHD-1)
USS Essex (LHD-2)
USS Kearsarge (LHD-3)
USS Boxer (LHD-4)
USS Bataan (LHD-5)
USS Bonhomme Richard (LHD-6)
USS Iwo Jima (LHD-7)
USS Makin Island (LHD-8)
USS Nassau (LHA-4)
USS Peleliu (LHA-5)
USS Emory S. Land (AS-39)

Former or historical military prisons 
Army Regional Confinement Facility at Fort Carson, Colorado
Army Regional Confinement Facility at Fort Knox, Kentucky (closed 2010)
Army Regional Confinement Facility at Fort Sill, Oklahoma
Marine Corps Brig, Camp Lejeune at Marine Corps Base Camp Lejeune, North Carolina
Portsmouth Naval Prison on Portsmouth Naval Shipyard, Seavey Island, Maine (closed 1974)
United States Disciplinary Barracks, Atlantic Branch at Castle Williams on Governors Island, New York City (closed 1965)
United States Disciplinary Barracks, Central Branch at Jefferson Barracks, Missouri
United States Disciplinary Barracks, East Central Branch, New Cumberland, Pennsylvania (closed 1959)
United States Disciplinary Barracks, Eastern Branch at Green Haven, New York
United States Disciplinary Barracks, Midwestern Branch at Fort Benjamin Harrison, Indianapolis, Indiana (closed 1947)
United States Disciplinary Barracks, Northeastern Branch at Pine Camp, New York
United States Disciplinary Barracks, Northern Branch, Milwaukee, Wisconsin (closed 1950)
United States Disciplinary Barracks, Northwestern Branch at Fort Missoula, Montana (closed 1947)
United States Disciplinary Barracks, Pacific Branch on Alcatraz Island, San Francisco Bay, California (closed 1933)
United States Disciplinary Barracks, Southeastern Branch at Camp Gordon, Georgia
United States Disciplinary Barracks, Southern Branch at North Camp Hood, Texas
United States Disciplinary Barracks, Southwestern Branch at Camp Haan, California

See also 
 Federal Bureau of Prisons
 Incarceration in the United States

References

 
Mil
Prisons